The Alexander Grzelachowski House and Store, in Puerto de Luna, New Mexico, was built in 1875.  It was listed on the National Register of Historic Places in 1993.

It is significant as "an exceptional example of a nineteenth-century, Territorial-style, combined dwelling and place of business."

See also

 National Register of Historic Places listings in Guadalupe County, New Mexico

References

External links

		
National Register of Historic Places in Guadalupe County, New Mexico
Houses completed in 1875